Pereira Silima (born 14 March 1959) is a Tanzanian CCM politician and Member of Parliament for Chumbuni constituency since 2010. He is the current Deputy Minister of Home Affairs.

References

1959 births
Living people
Chama Cha Mapinduzi MPs
Tanzanian MPs 2010–2015
Deputy government ministers of Tanzania
Lumumba Secondary School alumni